Hazed is a dark comedy about three young girls’ perilous journey through the world of sororities and eating disorders. It is a 160-page original graphic novel published by Image Comics in 2008, and is created by Mark Sable (writer of Image's Grounded and Fearless) and Robbi Rodriguez.

External links
Interview with Mark Sable
Newsarama interview.

2008 comics debuts
Image Comics graphic novels